Amasya Castle, a.k.a. Harşene Castle, is a fortress located in Amasya, northern Turkey.

Location
The castle is located north of Amasya and the river Yeşilırmak on the steep rocks called Mount Harşene.

History
The castle was attacked, ruined, changed hand and restored many times in the history during the Persian, Roman, Pontic and Byzantine era. The castle was severely ruined during the battles between the Romans and Pontics. It was substantially restored after the conquest of Amasya by the Ottomans in 1075, and remained in use until the 18th century when it lost its military importance.

While fleeing the invading troops of Timur in the first years of the 15th century, Ottoman then-şehzade Çelebi Mehmed took refuge in Amasya Castle.

Description
The castle has eight-level defensive emplacements outside the castle down to the banks of Yeşilırmak River. The top-level fortification is constructed in ashlar masonry while the defensive walls are made of rubble masonry. A rock-carved gallery known as "Cilanbolu" is situated in the middle of the castle. The castle has four gates, named "Helkıs", "Saray", "Maydonos" and "Meydan". It includes dungeons, a cistern and a well.

Other landmarks
Below the castle stand the ruins of a bastion and a mosque. On the southern hillside, there are ruins of the "Kızlar Sarayı" (literally: "Maidens' Palace"), used during the Ottoman period.

At about  height, in a sheer rock face, there are 18 large and small tombs of Pontic kings, dating to the 3rd century BC and carved into the limestone cliff.

References

Buildings and structures in Amasya Province
Castles in Turkey
Tourist attractions in Amasya Province